Aisha Rimi is from Katsina State in Northern Nigeria. She is the founding partner at Africa Law Practice (ALP), a commercial law firm in Nigeria. She is also a founding member of Halal Children's Orphanage. She is a law graduate (LLB and LLM) of the University of Buckingham in England. She is married to Folorunsho Coker, the Chairman of the Nigerian Tourism Development Corporation.

Early life and education 
Aisha was born and brought up in a Northern Muslim home in Nigeria. She hails from Katsina State. She graduated with a LLB degree from the University of Buckingham with a specialization in International Commercial Law and a Master of Laws from the same Institution.

Career 
Aisha Rimi started off her law career at Ajumogobia & Okeke from 1991 to 2001 before proceeding to Chadbourne & Parke as a visiting attorney where she spent only one year. From 2002 to 2007, she was a senior vice president at GWI Consulting. In 2007, she became a founding partner at Rimi & Partners. In May 2017, she merged with Olasupo Shasore (SAN), Uyiekpen Giwa-Osagie, Oyinkan Badejo-Okusanya, Bello Salihu and Atinuke Dosunmu to form a continental law firm, now known as Africa Law Practice (ALP Legal or ALP), which is associated with ALP International (in Mauritius) and with partner law offices in Kenya, Rwanda, South Africa, Tanzania, Uganda and Zambia.
At ALP, she is an attorney on foreign investment and regulatory compliance. She also advises on project finance, joint ventures (corporate and operational) and all manners of commercial legal practice and private clients. She is member of the  board of directors at CablePoint Ltd, Trasco Nig Ltd, Browns Café & Restaurant, and RNC Nigeria.

Personal life 
Aisha Rimi is married to Folorunsho Coker, the chairman of the Nigerian Tourism Development Corporation.

Philanthropy 
Aisha Rimi, through her firm (Africa Law Practice) runs a pro bono programme to help victims of domestic abuse get justice. She is the founding member of Halal Children's Orphanage.

References 

Living people
Nigerian women lawyers
Year of birth missing (living people)
20th-century Nigerian lawyers
21st-century Nigerian lawyers